WCRA 1090 AM is a radio station broadcasting a news talk format. Licensed to Effingham, Illinois, United States, the station is currently owned by Cromwell Radio Group, through licensee The Cromwell Group, Inc. of Illinois. WCRA carries a variety of talk shows such as Rush Limbaugh, Sean Hannity, and Dave Ramsey.

History
WCRA began broadcasting June 8, 1947, and ran 250 watts during daytime hours only. The station's power was increased to 1,000 watts in 1966.

References

External links
WCRA's website

CRA
News and talk radio stations in the United States
Radio stations established in 1947
1947 establishments in Illinois
CRA